Romanesque architecture in Poland dates back to the 11th century to the reign of Casimir I the Restorer. It was developed in and ranging approximately from the 11th century until well into the 13th century and it was succeeded by Polish Gothic architecture.

Romanesque style in Poland was preceded by Pre-Romanesque architecture of the early Polish state. Its prime foundations were the Wawel Cathedral in Kraków, the Gniezno Cathedral and the Poznań Cathedral (later re-built in different styles). Polish Romanesque architecture was influenced by the Polish Pre-Romanesque style. Most of Romanesque buildings in Poland can be found in Greater Poland, Kuyavia, Silesia and Lesser Poland regions. Many Polish Romanesque buildings represent the characteristic Brick Romanesque style due to limited stone resources. Majority of these buildings are churches, rotundas and chapels. Most significant Polish Romanesque buildings include the Collegiate church in Tum, St. Nicholas Church in Wysocice, St. Peter and Paul-Collegiate in Kruszwica and the Saint Nicholas rotunda church in Cieszyn. The best known civil Polish Romanesque building is the Keep of the Royal Castle in Lublin.

Gallery

References

 
11th-century architecture
Romanesque architecture